Kuhik may refer to:
 Kuhik, Amirabad
 Kuhik, Avalan